Steve Hiett  (26 December 1940 – 28 August 2019) was a British photographer, musician, artist and graphic designer based in Paris.

Life and work
From 1957 Hiett studied painting at Worthing Art School. In 1959 he changed to Brighton Art School to study graphic design, he also began studying photography.

After studying he joined a psych/pop band, Pyramid. This experience led to him photographing Jimi Hendrix backstage in the 1970s. In addition Hiett began a series of photos of empty suburban streets that resulted in his first book, Pleasure Places (Flash Books, 1975).

In 1968 he began his career as a fashion photographer for Nova magazine. In 1972 he moved to Paris and his work began to be published regularly in Marie Claire, Vogue, Elle and other magazines.

During the 1980s he worked as a photographer and developed his signature style of over-saturated images, off-centre framing and dazzling flash.

In the same period he made a guitar solo album in Japan for Sony/CBS: Down on the Road by the Beach accompanied by a photo book. He said "I just loved writing music and playing guitar. When all that came to a close for various reasons I still took my guitar with me where ever I went. In the 80's I made a guitar album in Japan and also played on some french tv commercials and actually had a hit on a record in France by the singer Valli which I co produced and played guitar on. I am still working at playing guitar and writing music." The album has since amassed a cult following. 

In the 1990s Hiett moved to New York City and did graphic design and typography. There he met Carla Sozzani, who invited him to return to Paris and work for Vogue Italia. He said "I then realised there was a whole new world of fashion magazines. And my career as a fashion photographer seemed to start all over again. My style has evolved with the new digital technology but I guess it still looks almost the same."

In 2014 he led the judging of the photography category at the Hyeres Festival, during which a retrospective entitled Steve Hiett: The Song Remains the Same was held at Villa Noailles.

Hiett photographed such celebrities as; Jimi Hendrix, Sophia Loren, The Beach Boys, The Doors, Miles Davis, Uma Thurman, Diane Kruger, Nathalie Wood, Julie Driscoll, The Rolling Stones, Sandie Shaw, Joni Mitchell, and The Hollies. He worked for the fashion magazines  Marie Claire, Vogue Italia, The Face, Vogue France, Vogue China, Vogue Russia, Vogue Spain, Harper's Bazaar, Visionnaire, Hunger, Nova, Elle, Spoon Magazine and Glamour. He worked for the brands Roberto Cavalli, Guy Laroche, Oscar de la Renta, Big, and Piaget.

 Personal life 
Hiett was born on 26 December 1940 in Oxford. Later, his parents moved him and his sister from the East End of London to Lancing, West Sussex where they grew up. He has a daughter and two grandchildren. In 2018, Hiett married former fashion model and modelling agent Louise Despointes. He died aged 78 on 28 August 2019.

 Exhibitions Down on the Road by the Beach, Galerie Watari, Tokyo, May 1983Vogue's Glittering World, Galleria Carla Sozzani, Milan, 1999La Femme Cachée – London, Berlin, Milan, Shangai, C/O Berlin, Berlin, 2003Electric Fashion, Wouter van Leeuwen, Amsterdam, 2007Visiontrack, Galerie Maeght, Paris, 2009Out Takes, Somerset House, London, 2012The Song Remains the Same, Villa Noailles, Hyères, Hyères 2014 , 2014Urban Grace, 7.24×0.26 Gallery, Milan, Italy, 2014She Knows Me Too Well: Some Early Photographs, Galerie Madé, Paris, 2014/15Beyond Blonde, Galleria Carla Sozzani, Milan, Italy, 2016Cool Pola, Galerie La Hune, Paris, 2016/17Steve Hiett Polaroids, Galerie Madé, Paris, 2017

 Publications Pleasure Places. Flash, 1975. .Down on the Road by the Beach. Sony/CBS, 1982.Hyper Real Soul. gallery 213, 2000.Femme Cachée. Joop Jeans; Milan: Vogue Italia, 2005.Glittering World. Condé Nast Italy, 2006.Portraits de Ville: New York. Paris: be-pôles, 2012. .Roland Garros. Paris: Martiniere, 2015. . With a preface by Philippe Labro.Beyond Blonde.'' Munich: Prestel, 2015. Philippe Garner. . "Traces the evolution of his first shots, taken in Bromley of "simple pictures of quiet empty places" to his time as art director at Arthur Elgort's Model Manual and his ongoing work in fashion today."

References

External links 
 
 Steve Hiett at D+V Management
 

1940 births
2019 deaths
Photographers from Sussex
Fashion photographers
Photographers from Paris
British emigrants to France